Hypsicalotes is a genus of the family Agamidae having a single species Hypsicalotes kinabaluensis found in Malaysia.

References

Agamidae
Taxa named by Ulrich Manthey
Taxa named by Wolfgang Denzer
Monotypic lizard genera